Canadian Reference Materials (CRM) are certified reference materials of high-quality and reliability produced by the National Metrology Institute of Canada – the National Research Council Canada. The NRC Certified Reference Materials program is operated by the Measurement Science and Standards portfolio and provides CRMs for environmental, biotoxin, food, nutritional supplement, and stable isotope analysis. The program was established in 1976 to produce CRMs for inorganic and organic marine environmental analysis and remains internationally recognized producer of CRMs.

Inorganic CRMs

NRC produces certified reference materials of biological tissues, isotopic standards, natural waters, sediments, supplements, and natural health products. With the exception of the ORMS, the river water CRM with elevated mercury, all materials contain natural levels of analytes in their native matrix.
 Biological tissues
 DOLT, dogfish liver for trace metals
 DORM, fish protein for trace metals
 LUTS, non-defatted lobster hepatopancreas for trace metals
 TORT, lobster hepatopancreas for trace metals
 Isotopic materials
 NIMS, natural inorganic mercury standard
 EMMS, isotopic methylmercury standard
 Natural waters
 CASS, near-shore seawater for trace metals 
 MOOS, seawater for nutrients
 NASS, seawater for trace metals 
 ORMS, river water for mercury
 SLEW, estuarine water for trace metals
 SLRS, river water for trace metals
 Sediments
 HISS and MESS, marine sediment for trace metals and major constituents 
 PACS and SOPH, marine sediment for trace metals and major constituents
 Supplements and natural health products
 CACB, calcium carbonate for lead and cadmium
 FEBS, otolith for trace metals
 SELM, selenium-enriched yeast for selenium

Organic CRMs
In 1977, Edmonds et al. reported the identification, isolation, and synthesis of major arsenic-containing substance in sea organisms, the arsenobetaine. In 1999, NRC certified arsenobetaine in the dogfish muscle material DORM-2, which became the first matrix reference material certified for arsenobetaine. Before DORM-2, DORM-1 (issued in 1986) served as the reference material for which the concentration of arsenobetaine was widely reported in scientific literature. Besides arsenobetaine, NRC currently offers matrix reference materials certified for methylmercury (TORT-3), dibutyltin, and tributyltin (PACS-3).

 Biological tissues and sediments
 CARP, fish for dioxins, furans, and PCBs
 DOLT, dogfish liver for methylmercury
 DORM, fish protein for methylmercury
 TORT, lobster hepatopancreas for methylmercury and arsenobetaine
 PACS and SOPH, marine sediment for dibutyltin and tributyltin
 SELM, selenium-enriched yeast for methionine and selenomethionine

Biotoxin CRMs

In 1987 Canada witnessed a crisis in the seafood industry. Shellfish toxins present in PEI mussels caused amnesic shellfish poisoning taking several lives. In response, shellfish toxin research was initiated at NRC Canada. Today, NRC remains the premier producer of biotoxin CRMs in the world and is recognized for its expertise.

 Amnesic shellfish poisoning toxins
 ASP-Mus-d, mussel tissue for domoic acid and its isomers
 DA-f, domoic acid standard
 Diarrhetic shellfish poisoning and other lipophilic toxins
 AZA, azaspiracid standards
 DSP-Mus, mussel tissue for okadaic acid
 OA, okadaic acid standard
 DTX, dinophysistoxin standards
 GYM, gymnodimine standards
 PTX, pectenotoxin-2 standard
 SPX, 13-desmethyl spirolide C standard
 Microcystins
  and MCLR, microcystin-LR standards
 MCRR, microcystin-RR standard
 NODR, nodularin-R standard
 Paralytic shellfish poisoning toxins
 C1&2, N-sulfocarbamoyl-gonyautoxin standard
  and GTX, decarbamoyl-gonyautoxin and gonyautoxin standards
  and NEO, decarbamoyl-neosaxitoxin and neosaxitoxin standards
  and STX, decarbamoyl-saxitoxin and saxitoxin standards
 Cyanobacterial toxins
 ATX, anatoxin-a standard
 CYN, cylindrospermopsin standard

See also
 Certified reference materials

References

External links

Canadian Reference Materials and Methods (National Science Library, Digital Repository)

Analytical chemistry
Measurement
Standards of Canada
Biochemistry